Helicodiscus is a genus of air-breathing land snails, terrestrial pulmonate gastropod mollusks in the family Helicodiscidae.

Species 
Species within the genus Helicodiscus include:
 Helicodiscus diadema
 Helicodiscus eigenmanni (Chamberlin and Berry, 1929) - Mexican coil
 Helicodiscus hexodon
 Helicodiscus parallelus - the type species

References 

Helicodiscidae
Taxonomy articles created by Polbot